The 1st Battalion New York Volunteer Sharpshooters was a battalion of sharpshooters in the Union Army during the American Civil War. Fighting in the Eastern Theater it was attached to the 1st United States Sharpshooters.

History

Major William S. Rowland received authority from the War Department to recruit a regiment of sharpshooters in the States of New York and Pennsylvania on October 10, 1862. When the regimental organization failed in sufficient numbers a battalion was organized into four companies, the 6th, 7th, 8th and 9th. A tenth company was considered, but never created.

Company Commanders and Recruiting areas

6th Company, Flank Company, L 108 N. Y. Volunteers: Captain Abijah C. Gray - Rochester - Mustered for three years on September 13, 1862
                   
7th Company, Company L, 112th N. Y. Volunteers: Captain Joseph S. Arnold, Captain Clinton Perry - Elicottt, Kian-tone, Busti, Ellington, Ellery, Carroll and Jamestown
                    
8th Company: Captain Edward G. Robinson - Buffalo, Hudson and Chatham
                    
9th Company: Captain Thomas S. Bradley - Albany, Hudson, Canaan, Hinsdale and New Lebanon

10th Company - Capt. Charles M. White - organized January 13, 1863; was originally intended for a service of nine months, on April 21, 1863 the term of service was changed to three years; the company was not completed and the enlisted men were transferred

Casualties
Out of a total of 157 casualties, the regiment suffered 27 men killed or mortally wounded, 68 officers and men wounded but recovered, and 62 officers and men missing in action .

References

See also
1st United States Sharpshooters
List of New York Civil War regiments

Sharpshooters 001
Sharpshooter units and formations of the American Civil War
1861 establishments in New York (state)